The Y P Desert is a desert and ecoregion, within the deserts and xeric shrublands biome, in Owyhee County, Idaho, and Elko County, Nevada in the northwestern United States.

The Y P Desert lies at the eastern edges of the Owyhee Desert, and is home to the South Fork Owyhee River Recreation Area.

Josephine Reservoir, a small reservoir, Hat Peak, and the Duck Valley Indian Reservation are at the eastern perimeter of the Y P Desert.

References
Nevada Atlas and Gazetteer, 2001, pg. 22
 USGS Feature Detail Report #1, USGS Feature Detail Report #2
 USGS US Topo 7.5-minute map

Deserts of Idaho
Deserts of Nevada
Deserts and xeric shrublands in the United States
Ecoregions of the United States
Northwestern United States
Great Basin deserts
Deserts of the United States
Protected areas of Owyhee County, Idaho
Protected areas of Elko County, Nevada
Bureau of Land Management areas in Idaho
Bureau of Land Management areas in Nevada